Polynoncus gemmifer is a species of hide beetle in the subfamily Omorginae found in Brazil, Argentina, Chile, and Uruguay.

References

Polynoncus
Beetles described in 1846